Little Creek Peak is a mountain in eastern Iron County in southwestern Utah in the United States.  
The mountain is in the Dixie National Forest.

References

Mountains of Utah
Landforms of Iron County, Utah